Savar (Bengali: সাভার) is an Upazila of Dhaka District in the Division of Dhaka, Bangladesh and is located at a distance of about 24 kilometers (15 mi) to the northwest of Dhaka city. Savar is mostly famous for the National Martyrs' Memorial, the national monument for the martyrs of the Liberation War of Bangladesh.

History

The origin of the name Savar is thought to be an evolved version of the ancient 7th-8th century township of সর্বেশ্বর Shôrbeshshôr ("Lord of everything") or সম্ভার Shômbhar situated on the banks of the river known today as the Bangshi. Shôrbeshshôr, in turn, is said to have been established on the site of the ancient Sambagh Kingdom. Local legends as well as archeological finds indicate a king by the name of Harishchandra, said to be of the Pala dynasty, ruled over Shôrbeshshôr - purportedly from the first half of the 7th century having arrived from the Rarh region. There is an old shloka that goes বংশাবতী-পূর্বতীরে সর্বেশ্বর নগরী, বৈসে রাজা হরিশচন্দ্র জিনি সূরপুরী Bôngshaboti-purbotire shôrbeshshôr nôgori, boishe raja Horishchôndro jini shurpuri ("On the East banks of the Bangsabati is the city of Sharbeshvar, lives there King Harishchandra conquering Heaven"). There is some contention among historians about legends surrounding the reign of Harishchandra, as they may relate to other monarchs bearing the same or similar name (e.g. Harishchandra of the mythic Suryavansha, king Harishchandra of Bikrampur among others). In any case local legend holds that the childless Harishchandra was succeeded to the throne by his sister Rajeswari's son, Damodar. Damodar's reign started a decline for the kingdom, culminating in the reign of one of his descendants, king Ravan, a music enthusiast. During Ravan's reign, the Koch invaded and sacked the capital established by Harishchandra. However, inscriptions on an undated burnt brick fragment indicates, king Mahendra in 869 CE dedicated a matha to his father, saint king Harishchandra, son of king Ranadhirasena, son of king Dhimantasena, son of king Bhimasena. The same inscription also states the Buddhist king Dhimantasena invaded and captured the land between the Bangshi and the Brahmaputra and king Ranadhirasena extended the kingdom to the Himalayas and fixed his residence in the city of Shômbhar.

During the 1971 war, Savar Cantonment (then Ansar Camp) and the then-newly founded Jahangirnagar University were some of the first targets of military swoop outside the capital following Operation Searchlight of 25 March. In December of that year, Savar was the last obstacle before the freedom fighters (led by Kader Siddiqui and others) entered the capital, and the Pakistan army conceded defeat. Days before the end of the war, teenager Golam Dastagir Titu was killed in a direct encounter between the Pakistani Army and the freedom fighters. The compatriots buried him near the main gate of the Central Cattle Breeding & Dairy Farm, Savar. The Bangladeshi Army constructed a memorial monument in his honor.

On 24 November 2012, a garment factory fire killed at least 112 people. The factory-made clothes for US and European companies and were faulted for negligent safety standards. Walmart and Sears, two of the companies who contracted work from this factory, refused to compensate victims.

On 24 April 2013, a building in Savar collapsed, killing 1,129 people and injuring around 2,500. The building housed a garment factory that exported clothing to US and European companies. Eighty percent of the workers were women aged 18–20, paid $0.12-$0.26 per hour.

Geography
Savar is located at  23°51′30″N 90°16′00″E  /  23.8583°N 90.2667°E  / 23.8583; 90.2667. It has 66,956 units of household and a total area of 280.13 square kilometers (108.16 sq mi). It is bounded by Kaliakair and Gazipur Sadar Upazilas on the north, Keraniganj Upazila on the south, Mirpur, Mohammadpur, Pallabi, and Uttara thanas of Dhaka City on the east, and Dhamrai and Singair Upazilas on the west. The land of the Upazila is composed of alluvium soil of the Pleistocene period. The height of the land gradually increases from the east to the west. The southern part of the Upazila is composed of the alluvium soil of the Bangshi and Dhalashwari rivers. The main rivers are Bangshi, Turag, Buriganga, and Karnatali. The Bangshi River has become polluted due to industrialization. The total cultivable land measures 16,745.71 hectares (41,379.6 acres), in addition to fallow land of 10,551.18 hectares (26,072.5 acres).

Demographics

As of the 2011 Bangladesh census, Savar Upazila had a population of 1,387,426. Males constituted 54.20% of the population, and females 45.80%. This Upazila's eighteen-up population was 207,401. Savar had an average literacy rate of 65.16% (7+ years) and a national average of 59.4% literate. Male literacy was 69%, and female was 58%. The religious breakdown was Muslim 88.59%, Hindu 9.41%, Christian 1.93%, Buddhist 0.03%, others 0.04%, and ethnic minority group nationals numbered 319 including Buno, Garo, Chakma (Sangma), and Burman. The main occupations are Agriculture 24.34%, agricultural labourer 12.84%, wage labourer 4.44%, cattle breeding, forestry and fishing 1.90%, industry 1.37%, commerce 17.35%, service 20.68%, construction 1.66%, transport 3.96% and others 11.46%.

Economy
Agriculture and manufacturing are the two major economic sectors in Savar. The main crops grown here are Paddy, Jute, peanut, onion, garlic, chili, and other vegetables. The extinct or nearly extinct crops in the region are Aus paddy, Asha Kumari paddy, sesame, linseed, kali mator, randhuni saj, mitha saj, kaun, and mas kalai. The main fruits cultivated here are Jackfruit, mango, olive, papaya, guava, kamranga, berry, and banana. There are 181 combined fisheries, dairies, poultries, five hatcheries, 209 poultries, and 1319 fisheries. Manufacturing facilities include Ceramic industry, beverage industry, press and publication, garments industry, foot ware, jute mills, textile mills, printing and dyeing factory, transformer industry, automobile industry, biscuit and bread factory, pharmaceutical industry, soap factory, brickfield, cold storage, welding, plant nursery, etc. Bangladesh Export Processing Zone is located in this Upazila. The Cottage industry includes 8 Weaving, 100 goldsmith, and 29 others workshops. The main exports are Jackfruit, papaya, flower, sapling, dairy products, meat, transformer, fabrics, dye, medicine, ready-made garments, electronics and electric goods, shoe, brick, sweetmeat, etc.

There is 62 km of pucca (first-class), 56 km of semi pucca, 562 km of mud road, and 50 km of highway. Transports used here include the traditional (and extinct or nearly extinct) Palanquin, bullock cart, horse carriage, and modern-day vehicles.

The minimum wage is approximately $9.50 per week or $38 per month.

Administration
Savar Thana was established in 1912 and was turned into an Upazila in 1983.

Savar Upazila is divided into Savar Municipality and 13 union parishads: Aminbazar, Ashulia, Banogram, Bhakurta, Birulia, Dhamsona, Kaundia, Pathalia, Savar, Shimulia, Tetuljhora, and Yearpur. The union parishads are subdivided into 220 mauzas and 380 villages.

Savar Municipality is subdivided into nine wards and 57 mahallas.

The area of the town is 24.1 km2. It had a population of 124,885; male 53.03%, female 46.97%; population density per km2 of 5182. Presently, Savar Upazila is divided into two thanas, one is Savar Main, and the other is Ashulia.

Politics

Several Hindu families and some Muslim people ("Hira Lal Sarkar," who was the collector of the British Government) played a critical role in the development of the township during the British Raj in the 19th and first half of the 20th century. After the partition of India in 1947, the Hindu influence in the area waned following the departure of many prominent Hindu families. The 1960s saw some important institutions, including a dairy farm and a university in the area. Concurrently, communist politics was on the rise in the area. However, this was replaced with Bengali nationalist zeal when the Bangladesh Awami League won the 1970 election in this constituency. In 1975, Savar came to the spotlight when the Maoist leader Shiraj Shikdar was secretly tortured and executed at Savar Cantonment. Savar was politically important to the military dictators of the mid-1970s and 1980s, as the cantonment armory here was the closest one outside the capital.

From the 1990s to mid-2000s, the Bangladesh Nationalist Party candidate has been routinely elected to parliament from this constituency. However, the Bangladesh Awami League and other parties, Communist Party of Bangladesh, Socialist Party of Bangladesh, Worker's Party (Menon), National Awami Party, Sammobady Dal (including several Islamist ones) continue to have a grassroots presence. The end of 2008 saw a Bangladesh Awami League candidate elected to parliament from this constituency. Bangladesh Awami League 3rd time ruling over Bangladesh and also this Upazila. By this time people of Savar have their 1st MP, who is selected as "State Minister for Disaster Management and Relief Dr. Md Enamur Rahman" from 2019 January. Jahangirnagar University and a few colleges in the area serve as a hotbed of active student politics and strife. Foreign dignitaries customarily visit Savar as a part of their trip to Bangladesh to pay respect to the martyrs of 1971 at the National Martyrs' Memorial.

List of shopping malls in Savar 
There are the following shopping malls in Savar.

 Sena Shopping Complex is a six-storied shopping complex in Nobinagar. It is the biggest shopping mall in Savar.
 Savar City Center is in Savar bus stand, and it is the oldest shopping mall in Savar.
 Savar New Market is on opposite side of the City Center. It is a four-storied shopping mall.
 Razzak Plaza is in Savar bus stand.

Educational institutions
The following are some of the notable institutions of Savar
Army Institute of Business Administration
Bangladesh Krira Shikkha Protishtan
Bangladesh Livestock Research Institute
Bangladesh Public Administration Training Centre
Jahangirnagar University
BRAC University Residential Campus
Daffodil International University
City University
Eastern University
Asian University of Bangladesh
Manarat International University
Enam Medical College and Hospital
Gono Biswabidyalay
Atomic Energy Research Establishment (Bangladesh)
National Institute of Biotechnology
National Institute of Textile Engineering and Research

Important structures and establishments 
There are so many important installations in Savar, some of them are following -

 National Martyrs' Memorial, the national monument of Bangladesh, is set up in Savar in the memory of those who died in the Bangladesh Liberation War of 1971, which brought independence and separated Bangladesh from Pakistan.
 Atomic Energy Research Establishment is a government nuclear research station in Bangladesh and is located in Savar Upazila, Bangladesh. It is under the control of the Bangladesh Atomic Energy Commission and is the largest installation under the commission.
 Dhaka Export Processing Zone (DEPZ) is located in Savar Upazila and was established in 1993.
 Savar is the home of Jahangirnagar University, a public university of Bangladesh, which is famous for its scenic beauty and as a prime destination for Siberian migratory birds during winter.
 Centre for the Rehabilitation of the Paralysed (CRP), the nation's only specialized rehabilitation hospital, is located in Savar, about 1 kilometer (0.62 mi) from Savar Bazar.
 The 9th infantry division of Bangladesh Army is garrisoned there in Savar Cantonment.
 Army Institute of Business Administration (Army IBA), a business school run by the Bangladesh Army in affiliation with the Bangladesh University of Professionals, is located in Savar Cantonment, Savar, Dhaka.
 Bangladesh Public Administration Training Centre (BPATC), the only training center for the public service commissioned officers in Bangladesh, is located there.
 Bangladesh Betar's employers' residence - Radio Colony and The Transmission Zone with high power transmission setup is situated in Savar.
 The two largest entertainment theme parks of Bangladesh, namely Fantasy Kingdom and Nondon Park, are also located here. The Fantasy Kingdom is situated in Jamgora Bazar, and Nondon Park is situated in Jirani Bazar.

Some other important establishments of Savar are Satellite Ground Receiving Station (Talibabad), Savar Youth Training Centre, etc.

Notable residents
 Keya Payel, actress, was born in Ashulia.

See also
 Divisions of Bangladesh
 Districts of Bangladesh
 Upazilas of Bangladesh

References

General
 NK Bhattasali, 'The Math Inscription of Mahendra, Son of Harish Chandra of Sabhar', Dacca Review, 1920
 GM Laskar, 'Notes on Raja Harish Chandra of Sabhar', Dacca Review, 1920
 MM Hoque, SMK Ahsan and SSM Rahman, 'Pre-Muslim Settlement and Chronology of Savar Region', Pratnatattva, 1996
 AKM Shahnawaz and MM Hoque, 'Savar: History and Archaeology', in Souvenir, 9th Bangladesh Science Conference, held in Jahanginagar University, 1996.

Upazilas of Dhaka District